Mun In-ju (born 22 August 1999) is a footballer who plays as a midfielder for Gainare Tottori. Born in Japan, he is a North Korea youth international.

Career

Mun started his career with Japanese third tier side Gainare Tottori. On 19 June 2022, he debuted for Gainare Tottori during a 2–0 win over Tegevajaro Miyazaki. On 23 October 2022, Mun scored his first goal for Gainare Tottori during a 3–2 win over Giravanz Kitakyushu.

References

External links

 

1999 births
Association football midfielders
Gainare Tottori players
J3 League players
Japanese footballers
Japanese people of North Korean descent
Living people
North Korea youth international footballers
North Korean footballers